Kill or Be Killed is a 1950 American crime film directed by Max Nosseck and written by Arnold Lipp, Max Nosseck and Lawrence L. Goldman. The film stars Lawrence Tierney, George Coulouris, Marissa O'Brien, Rudolph Anders, Lopes da Silva and Veloso Pires. It was released in April 1950 by Eagle-Lion Films. The film's sets were designed by the art director Erwin Scharf.

Plot

Cast          
Lawrence Tierney as Robert Warren
George Coulouris as Victor Sloma
Marissa O'Brien as Maria Marek
Rudolph Anders as Gregory Marek
Lopes da Silva as Huerta
Veloso Pires as Damiao
Leonor Maia as Nina
João Amaro as Jose
Licinio Sena as Procopio
Helga Liné as Dancer
Mira Lobo as Overseer

References

External links
 

1950 films
1950s English-language films
American crime films
1950 crime films
Eagle-Lion Films films
Films directed by Max Nosseck
American black-and-white films
Films scored by Karl Hajos
1950s American films